Ahmed Ali   (1 July 1910 in Delhi – 14 January 1994 in Karachi) was a Pakistani novelist, poet, critic, translator, diplomat and scholar. A pioneer of the modern Urdu short story, his works include the short story collections: Angarey (Embers), 1932; Hamari Gali (Our Lane), 1940; Qaid Khana (The Prison-house), 1942; and Maut Se Pehle (Before Death), 1945. His other writings include Twilight in Delhi (1940), his first novel in the English language.

Biography
Born in Delhi, British India, Ahmed Ali was educated at Aligarh Muslim University and Lucknow University; in the latter "having achieved the highest marks in English in the history of the university." From 1932 to 1946, he taught at the leading Indian universities including Allahabad University and his alma mater in Lucknow. He also joined the Bengal Senior Educational Service as professor and head of the English Department at Presidency College, Calcutta (1944–47) and was the BBC's Representative and Director in India during World War II, from 1942 to 1945. Following that, he was the British Council Visiting Professor to Nanjing University, as appointed by the British government of India. In 1948, when he tried to return home after the Partition, K. P. S. Menon (then India's ambassador to China) would not allow it because Ali had not indicated his preferences as a government employee; that is, whether to remain in India or transfer to Pakistan. As a result, he was forced to go to Pakistan.

In 1948, he moved to Karachi. Later, he was appointed Director of Foreign Publicity for the Pakistani Government. At the behest of Prime Minister Liaquat Ali Khan, he joined the Pakistan Foreign Service in 1950. According to custom, tiles were drawn to determine the country of assignment. Ali's tile was blank, so he chose China and became Pakistan's first envoy to the new People's Republic. He established formal diplomatic relations that same year. He also helped to establish an embassy in Morocco.

Literary career
Ahmed Ali started his literary career at a young age and became a co-founder of the All-India Progressive Writers' Movement along with the writer Sajjad Zaheer who had become well known by the publication of Angaaray (Embers) in 1932. It was a collection of short stories in the Urdu language and was a bitter critique of middle-class Muslim values in British India. In addition to Ali, it included stories by three of his friends; Mahmud al-Zafar, Sajjad Zaheer and Rashid Jahan. This book was later banned by the British Government of India in March 1933. Shortly afterward, Ali and Zafar announced the formation of a "League of Progressive Authors", which was later to expand and become the All-India Progressive Writers' Association. Ali presented his paper "Art Ka Taraqqi-Pasand Nazariya" (A Progressive View of Art) in its inaugural conference in 1936.

Ali achieved international fame with his first novel written in English Twilight in Delhi, which was published by the Hogarth Press in London in 1940. This novel, as its title implies, describes the decline of the Muslim aristocracy with the advance of the British colonialism in the early 20th century.

Al-Quran, A Contemporary Translation (Princeton University Press, Oxford University Press & Akrash Publishing) is his most notable contribution in the field of translation. According to the book's description it is "approved by eminent Islamic scholars", and "it has come to be recognized as one of the best existing translations of the holy Quran." Other languages he translated from, apart from Arabic and Urdu, included Indonesian and Chinese.

Awards and recognition
 Elected a Founding Fellow of the Pakistan Academy of Letters in 1979.
 Sitara-i-Imtiaz (Star of Excellence) Award in 1980 by the President of Pakistan
 Conferred an honorary doctorate degree in 1993 by the University of Karachi.
 On 14 January 2005, Pakistan Post issued a commemorative postage stamp in his honor in its 'Men of Letters' series.

Works

Novels
Twilight in Delhi(1940)
Ocean of Night(1964)
Rats and Diplomats(1986)

Plays
The Land of Twilight (1931)
Break the Chains (1932)

Short stories
"When the Funeral Was Crossing the Bridge," in Lucknow University Journal, 1929.
"Mahavaton Ki Ek Rât," in Humayûn (Lahore), January 1931.
Angarey (1932). With Rashid Jahan, Mahmuduzzafar and Sajjad Zaheer.
Sholey (1934)
"Our Lane," in New Writing (London), 1936.
Hamari Gali (1940)
"Morning in Delhi," in New Writing (London), 1940.
Qaid-khana (1942)
Maut se Pahle (1945)
"Before Death," in New Directions 15 (New York), 1956.
Prima della Morte (1966). Bilingual Italian-Urdu version of Maut se Pahle.
The Prison-House (1985)

Poetry
Purple Gold Mountain (1960)
First Voices (1965)
Selected Poems (1988)

Literary criticism
"Poetry: A Problem,” in Allahabad University Studies, vol. XI, no. II, 1934.
Art ka Taraqqî-Pasand Nazariya (1936)
“Maxim Gorky as a Short-Story Writer," in Lucknow University Journal, 1938.
Mr. Eliot's Penny-World of Dreams (1941)
Failure of an Intellect (1968)
"Illusion and Reality, the Art and Philosophy of Raja Rao," in Journal of Commonwealth Literature, July 1968.
The Problem of Style and Technique in Ghalib (1969)
Ghalib: Two Essays (1969). With Alessandro Bausani.
The Golden Tradition: An Anthology of Urdu Poetry (1973)

Translation
The Flaming Earth (1949). An anthology of selected Indonesian poems.
The Falcon and the Hunted Bird (1950)
The Bulbul and the Rose: An Anthology of Urdu Poetry (1960)
Ghalib: Selected Poems (1969)
al-Qur’ân: A Contemporary Translation (1984)
The Call of the Trumpet (unpublished). An anthology of modern Chinese poetry

References

External links
Online Quran includes the Qur'an translation by Ahmed Ali.
Twilight in Delhi – a novel by Ahmed Ali on GoogleBooks website

1910 births
1994 deaths
Pakistani novelists
Pakistani scholars
Pakistani educators
English-language writers from Pakistan
Academic staff of the University of Allahabad
Translators of the Quran into English
Writers from Delhi
University of Lucknow alumni
Aligarh Muslim University alumni
Academic staff of the University of Calcutta
Islamic fiction writers
Ambassadors of Pakistan to China
Muhajir people
Writers from Karachi
Recipients of Sitara-i-Imtiaz
20th-century translators
Progressive Writers' Movement